Dave Reeves (born 19 November 1967) is an English former professional footballer who played as a forward from 1986 to 2009.

He played in the Football League for many clubs, including making more than 100 appearances for each of Chesterfield, Bolton Wanderers and Carlisle United. He briefly held the assistant manager's position at Gainsborough Trinity prior to retiring from playing.

Playing career
Reeves was drafted into the first team squad at Sheffield Wednesday in 1986 aged 18. He played just under 20 first team games for The Owls while at the club between 1986 and 1989 and while at Hillsborough he spent time on loan with Scunthorpe United.

He transferred to non-league side Heswall F.C., where he stayed for one season, while there he re-joined Scunthorpe on loan and also spent time at Turf Moor with Burnley before joining Bolton Wanderers in 1989 for £80,000. Reeves stayed at Burnden Park until 1993 when he moved briefly to Notts County before a move to Carlisle United. Reeves went on to play for Preston North End, Chesterfield, Oldham Athletic and Scarborough before ending his career playing for Gainsborough Trinity.

Coaching career
Upon retiring from the game Reeves took up a position on the coaching staff at former club Gainsborough Trinity. He has since took up the position of Assistant Manager. Reeves remained the club's Assistant Manager until late August 2009. Following the dismissal of manager Steve Charles, Reeves and coach Steve Blatherwick were given temporary charge of first team affairs in a caretaker role. But after 1 game in charge, Reeves along with Blatherwick departed the club.

Personal life
His twin brother Alan was also a professional footballer, most notably with Rochdale, Wimbledon and Swindon Town. Dave was encouraged by his auntie Mary Burgess and uncle David Burgess to keep his football up from the young age of 7 when they placed him in a local football club. He is married to Julie and has a daughter Jessica.

Honours
Individual
 PFA Team of the Year: 1993–94 Third Division, 1994–95 Third Division

References

External links

Living people
1967 births
Sportspeople from Birkenhead
English footballers
Association football forwards
Sheffield Wednesday F.C. players
Scunthorpe United F.C. players
Notts County F.C. players
Bolton Wanderers F.C. players
Oldham Athletic A.F.C. players
Chesterfield F.C. players
Burnley F.C. players
Preston North End F.C. players
Scarborough F.C. players
Gainsborough Trinity F.C. players
Carlisle United F.C. players
Ards F.C. players
English Football League players
National League (English football) players
Gainsborough Trinity F.C. managers
Twin sportspeople
English twins
English football managers